Eóin Mac Suibhne (fl. 1310) was a fourteenth-century Scottish nobleman and a leading member of Clann Suibhne. In the middle of the thirteenth century, seemingly during the 1260s, Eóin's family appears to have been ejected from its homeland in Argyll by the Stewart/Menteith kindred. It may have been during this period that members of Clann Suibhne took up residence in Ireland.

In the first decade of the fourteenth century, Eóin appears on record claiming his family's Scottish lands. As such, Eóin campaigned on behalf of the English cause during the First War of Scottish Independence as a means of combating the Stewarts/Menteiths. An expedition by Eóin to reclaim his ancestral lordship may be referred to by a particular piece of mediaeval Gaelic poetry. Although a sixteenth-century source alleges that Eóin was the first Clann Suibhne Lord of Fanad, contemporary sources appear to show that the family gained the lordship later in the fourteenth century.

Background

Eóin was a member of Clann Suibhne, a family descended from the eponymous Suibhne mac Duinn Shléibhe. Eóin's father was Suibhne, son of Maol Mhuire an Sparáin. The latter was a son of Murchadh Mac Suibhne, grandson of Suibhne mac Duinn Shléibhe.

At some point in the mid thirteenth century—perhaps in the 1260s—Eóin's family appears to have been ejected from its homeland in Argyll. At about this point, the clan seems to have been displaced and replaced in the region by the Stewart/Menteith kindred. As such, it may have been at about this time that Clann Suibhne took up residence in Ireland, and it may have been during this period that the family began to act as suppliers of gallowglass warriors there. Eóin's great-grandfather, Murchadh Mac Suibhne, is certainly reported to have perished in Ireland, as the prisoner of the Earl of Ulster, in 1267.

As late as 1261, an earlier member of the clan, a certain Dubhghall mac Suibhne, is reported to have been the lord of Skipness Castle and its adjacent chapel. That year, according to a charter witnessed by Walter Stewart, Earl of Menteith, Dubhghall granted away some of his territory to Paisley Abbey. The following year, Dubhghall is said to have signed over Skipness, and lands in Knapdale, Kintyre, and Cowal.
  
The circumstances surrounding of Dubhghall's contract with Walter are unclear. There are no other records regarding the allotment of Clann Suibhne lands during this period, and it is not known if the Stewarts/Menteiths or their allies had already established themselves in Knapdale. One possibility is that Dubhghall and his family succumbed to a military campaign against them. The creation of the Stewart/Menteith lordship of Knapdale may have been undertaken in the context of extending Scottish royal authority into Argyll and the Isles. This transition of power certainly seems to have marked an increase in Scottish authority in Argyll. In any case, the continued Stewart/Menteith lordship of Knapdale is evidenced by Walter's grant of churches in Knapdale to Kilwinning Abbey, and by an act of parliament that notes the earl's land of Knapdale in 1293. Regardless, ensuing historical events reveal that later members of Clann Suibhne regarded this territorial arrangement as unacceptable.

Campaigning for the English in 1310

Eóin appears to be the subject of a remarkable piece of Gaelic poetry called Dál chabhlaigh ar Chaistéal Suibhne ("An assembling of a fleet against Castle Sween"). The poem was authored by Artúr Dall Mac Gurcaigh, and possibly composed for Eóin himself. Artúr's poem purports to describe a seaborne invasion of Castle Sween and surrounding Knapdale from Ireland. Whilst it is possible that the poem refers to an actual attack upon the ancestral Clann Suibhne seat, it is also possible that the composition merely depicts an idealised and exaggerated expedition that was never undertaken. In fact, there is reason to suspect that the poem was composed not for Eóin, but for a fourteenth-century member of the kindred, Eóghan, brother of Toirdhealbhach Caoch Mac Suibhne, Lord of Fanad. As such, Dál chabhlaigh ar Chaistéal Suibhne may instead concern a proposed expedition by Eóghan to reclaim his family's ancestral Scottish heritage.

Historically, in February 1306, Robert Bruce VII, Earl of Carrick, a claimant to the Scottish throne, murdered his chief rival to the kingship, John Comyn of Badenoch. Although the former seized the throne (as Robert I) by March, the English Crown immediately struck back, defeating his forces in June. By September, Robert was a fugitive, and seems to have escaped into the Hebrides. In 1307, at about the time of the death of Edward I, King of England in July, Robert mounted a remarkable return to power. By 1309, his opponents had been largely overcome, and he held his first parliament as king.

In 1310, King Edward II of England orchestrated an expedition into Scotland. One component of the campaign was a maritime force launched from Ireland under the command of Richard de Burgh, Earl of Ulster. One possibility is that Richard was meant to support the forces of the English-aligned Clann Dubhghaill in Argyll. It may well have been in the context of bolstering the campaign that the English Crown reached out to Eóin and other neighbouring maritime magnates.

Specifically, in July 1310, correspondence between Eóin and Edward II reveals that the English king granted Eóin—and Eóin's brothers Toirdhealbhach and Murchadh—the land of Knapdale which formerly belonged to their ancestors, as a means to continue to combat Walter's son, John Menteith, an adherent of the Scottish Crown. Clearly, the Stewart/Menteith opposition to Edward II was the catalyst for Eóin's support of the English. Clann Suibhne's alignment with the English, therefore, exemplifies how bitter long-standing local rivalries dictated the adherence or opposition to the Bruce cause. Further correspondence likewise evinces this royal grant to Eóin, and reveals that he was in the company of Aonghus Óg Mac Domhnaill and Hugh Bisset whilst on campaign against John. Eóin's letter to the king specifies that, although he was able to visit Knapdale and view it, he was unable to gain possession of it on account of the occupying forces of Eóin Mac Dubhghaill. In any case, in early August, within weeks of Richard's intended maritime campaign, Edward II redirected the fleet to Mann, and placed it under the command of Simon de Montagu.

If Dál chabhlaigh ar Chaistéal Suibhne indeed refers to a specific event, it is conceivable that this event took place at about the time of Edward II's grant to Eóin. Whatever the case, Clann Suibhne was apparently unable to make good of the king's grant, and never regained possession of Knapdale. The fact that th earl's maritime campaign never materialised as intended may account for Eóin's inability to secure his ancestral lands. In consequence of this failure, Eóin appears to have thereafter served in Ireland, where members of Clann Suibhne later served as military commanders. If the largely legendary sixteenth-century Leabhar Clainne Suibhne is to be believed, Eóin was banished from Scotland having killed a man, after which Eóin relocated to Ireland, and overcame the Uí Bresléin to become the first in a long line of Clann Suibhne lords of Fanad. However, there is reason to suspect that this account is erroneous. For example, this supposed massacre of the Uí Bresléin is not documented by any of the Irish annals. In fact, the Uí Bresléin were earlier dispossessed by the Uí Domhnaill, and the fifteenth- to sixteenth-century Annals of Ulster notes the death of the Uí Domhnaill Lord of Fanad in 1281. Also, Leabhar Clainne Suibhne notes that certain territories within Fanad were granted to Clann Suibhne by the Uí Domhnaill later in the fourteenth century, which suggests that Clann Suibhne was not then in possession of the lordship. In fact, the first recorded Clann Suibhne Lord of Fanad is Toirdhealbhach Caoch.

Final loss of the Clann Suibhne patrimony

In 1314, Edward II granted one of his Scottish retainers, a certain Dungal de Gyvelestone, the lands of Knapdale and Glendaruel. In this grant, these territories are stated to have been in the hands of John, and to have been earlier possessed by a certain "Suny Magurke"—presumably at some point in the late thirteenth century. On one hand, Suny's recorded name could indicate that he was the son of a man named Murchadh—perhaps a son of Murchadh Mac Suibhne who died in 1267, or a son of the like-named brother of Eóin noted in 1310.

Following Robert's consolidation of authority in Scotland, the lands of English adherents were forfeited and redistributed to close supporters of the Bruce cause. As such, the vast Clann Dubhghaill maritime territories were broken up and granted away to various kindreds. As for the former Clann Suibhne lordship of Knapdale, Robert apparently granted it to John. The latter's like-named grandson was certainly styled "Lord of Knapdale and Arran" in 1357, and is recorded to have granted various lands in the lordship—including Castle Sween—to Giolla Easbuig Caimbéal, Lord of Loch Awe.

Clann Suibhne connections with the Uí Domhnaill

Domhnall Óg Ó Domhnaill, King of Tír Chonaill was evidently allied in marriage with Clann Suibhne. According to the sixteenth-century pedigrees of the Uí Domhnaill, a daughter of a certain Mac Suibhne was the mother of Domhnall Óg's son and successor, Aodh. In fact, Domhnall Óg was himself fostered amongst Clann Suibhne, as evidenced by a contemporary poem composed by Giolla Brighde Mac Con Midhe. Aodh was first inaugurated as king in 1281. The fact that his mother is unlikely to have been born much later than 1250 suggests that she was not a daughter of Eóin. Nevertheless, Leabhar Clainne Suibhne claims that Eóin, by way of a daughter named Caiteríona, was indeed Aodh's maternal grandfather.

In September 1286, members of the faction concluded a pact, known as the Turnberry Band, in which certain Scottish and Anglo-Irish magnates pledged to support one another. Three of the cosignatories were members of the Stewart/Menteith kindred: Walter, and his two sons, Alexander and John. The participation of these men in the band could have also concerned their family's part in the annexation of the Clann Suibhne lordship in Argyll. Forced from its homeland, Clann Suibhne evidently found a safe haven in Tír Chonaill on account of its marital alliance with Domhnall Óg. Another cosignatory was Richard, son of the man in whose prison Murchadh Mac Suibhne died in 1267. As such, it is conceivable that the Stewart/Menteith aspect of the band concerned the continued threat that the family faced from Clann Suibhne, now seemingly seated in Tír Chonaill, and backed by Aodh. Likewise, the part played by the Earl of Ulster in Murchadh Mac Suibhne's demise could be evidence that this comital family of de Burgh was opposed to the settlement of Clann Suibhne in Ireland, and therefore aligned with the Stewarts/Menteiths in regard to the fate of Clann Suibhne.

Two other cosignatories were Aonghus Mór mac Domhnaill, Lord of Islay, and his succeeding son, Alasdair Óg, leading members of Clann Domhnaill. It is evident that a daughter of Aonghus Mór was married to Domhnall Óg, and that this woman was the mother of Domhnall Óg's son, Toirdhealbhach. As such, the participation of Aonghus Mór and Alasdair Óg in the band could well have concerned an attempt to install Toirdhealbhach—matrilineally descended from Clann Domhnaill—as King of Tír Chonaill over the competing claims of this man's opposing half-brother, Aodh—matrilineally descended from Clann Suibhne. Certainly, in 1290, the fifteenth- to sixteenth-century Annals of Connacht, the sixteenth-century Annals of Loch Cé, the seventeenth-century Annals of the Four Masters, and the Annals of Ulster report that Aodh was defeated at the hands of his half-brother, who thereby seized the kingship of Tír Chonaill through the power of Clann Domhnaill. Whether this clash was a direct result of the bond is uncertain, although it seems likely that Aonghus Mór's part in the pact concerned the value of his kindred's military might. When Toirdhealbhach was defeated again in 1295, the Annals of the Four Masters reports that he was forced from Tír Chonaill, and found sanctuary with Cineál Eoghain and Clann Domhnaill. Contentions between the half-brothers and their allies continued until Toirdhealbhach's defeat and death at the hands of Aodh in 1303. The Clann Suibhne gallowglasses that lent support to Aodh's cause may well have been commanded by Eóin, and it may have been from Tír Chonaill, with Aodh's backing, where Clann Suibhne launched its campaigns against the Stewarts/Menteiths. The history of Clann Suibhne in the thirteenth- and fourteenth centuries reveals not only the remarkable military power at the disposal of its leadership, but also the ability of these leaders to maintain cohesion without a fixed territorial base.

Ancestry

Notes

Citations

References

Primary sources

Secondary sources

External links

13th-century Scottish people
14th-century Scottish people
Medieval Gaels from Scotland
Scottish people of the Wars of Scottish Independence
Year of birth unknown
Year of death unknown